The Permanent Committee for Scholarly Research and Ifta (also the General Presidency of Scholarly Research and Ifta) is an Islamic organization in Saudi Arabia established by the King that issues rulings in Islamic jurisprudence (fiqh) and prepares research papers for the Council of Senior Scholars, which advises the king on religious matters.  Its members are drawn from the Council of Senior Scholars, of which it is a committee, and consist of the most senior Sunni scholars of fiqh in Saudi Arabia, including the Grand Mufti of Saudi Arabia as its head. The issuance of fataawa in Saudi Arabia is limited to members of the Council of Senior Scholars and a few other clerics.

Establishment
The committee was established along with the Council of Senior Scholars by royal decree on August 29, 1971 (8th of Rajab 1391 AH) by  King Faisal ibn Abd al-Aziz of Saudi Arabia. Under section four of the decree, it stated, 

“The Permanent Committee has been left the task of selecting its members from amongst the members of the Council (of Senior Scholars) in accordance with the Royal Decree. Its aim is to prepare research papers ready for discussion amongst the Council (of Senior Scholars), and issue fataawa on individual issues. This is by responding to the fatwa-seeking public in areas of 'aqeedah, 'ibaadah and social issues. It will be called: The Permanent Committee for Islamic Research and Fataawa (al-Lajnah ad-Daa'imah lil-Buhooth al-'Ilmiyyah wal-Iftaa.)”

It is possible to write to the Permanent Committee asking for a fatwa on a specific topic. Since its inception, the Permanent Committee has replied to Muslims not only in Saudi Arabia but in many other countries, seeking rulings in Fiqh (Islamic jurisprudence) on a variety of questions, including Hadith (sayings of the Prophet Muhammad), Ibadah (worship), and Aqeedah (Islamic creed) issues. 

In their fataawa, the Permanent Committee strive for thoroughness.  All fataawa are derived from evidence from the three sources of Islamic knowledge: the Qur'an, authentic Sunnah, and understanding of the rightly guided companions of the Prophet Muhammad. The fataawa writers will usually explain all the potential Islamic viewpoints of an issue and will then explain, which in their view is the most authentic opinion based on the evidence. The fatwas issued by the committee have been arranged in a compendium of 32 volumes.

Authority
In 2010, Saudi King Abdullah decreed that only officially approved religious scholars would be allowed to issue fatwas in Saudi Arabia, namely the 21 member Council of Senior Scholars, the country's highest religious body, and the (four or five) member Permanent Committee, whose members are drawn from the Council of Senior Scholars. 
A new committee affiliated with the Permanent Committee and headed by one Saleh bin Mohammed al-Luhaydan was created by the Council of Senior Scholars to supervise the issuance of fatwas and prevent unauthorized scholars from issuing any.  All imams and preachers were instructed by the Ministry of Islamic Affairs to abide by the edict and explain it their Friday sermons and violators were reprimanded.

Members

Current
As of early 2014 the members of the committee include 

Shaykh Abdul-Aziz ibn Abdullah Al Shaykh (Head and current Grand Mufti of Saudi Arabia)
Shaykh Saleh Al-Fawzan
Shaykh Abdullaah Ibn Munee

Former
Abd al-Aziz ibn Baz (Former Grand Mufti of Saudi Arabia)
Muhammad ibn Ibrahim Al ash-Sheikh (Former Grand Mufti of Saudi Arabia)
Abdullah al-Ghudayyan
Abdullah Ibn Jibreen
Bakr Abu Zayd
Abdullaah Ibn Hasan al-Qu'ood

References

External links
The Official website of the Permanent Committee for Islamic Research and Issuing Fatwas -- English language
fatwa-online.com — summary of the Permanent Committee
aliftaFatwas.WordPress.Com — The Permanent Committee for Islaamic Research & Verdicts

Islamic organisations based in Saudi Arabia
Fatwas